Acceleration in human development process is the phenomenon which has been registered in many populations around the world. This applies equally to the growth of certain anthropometric parameters and the speed of reaching sexual maturity. These facts illustrate the results of secular changes in body height and appearance of the first menstruation (menarche).

Increases in human stature are a main indicator of improvements in the average health of populations. The newest data set for the average height of adult male birth cohorts, from the mid-nineteenth century to 1980, in 15 European countries was studied (in the populations listed).

During a century average height increased by 11 cm representing a dramatic improvement of this phenomenon. The apparent acceleration of body height occurred during the periods around the two World Wars and after the Great Depression.

In the mid-nineteenth century European girls' menarche occurred at the average age of 16.5 years. One hundred years later, this age was reduced to under 12 years.

Increase in adult height of birth cohorts (cm/decade)

See also
Human development (biology)

References

Human biology
Human development
Biological anthropology